George Mason (d 1996) was a rugby league footballer, and later coach, for the Canterbury-Bankstown club.

Career
Mason played three seasons for Western Suburbs between 1927 and 1929.

His final year as a player was 1936 at the newly admitted Canterbury-Bankstown side playing in 12 matches.

Mason coached Canterbury-Bankstown for 1 season in 1937.

He is recognized as Canterbury's 41st ever player and their third ever coach. George Henry Mason died on 5 February 1996.

References

1996 deaths
Australian rugby league players
Canterbury-Bankstown Bulldogs coaches
Canterbury-Bankstown Bulldogs players
Year of birth missing
Place of birth missing
Western Suburbs Magpies players